Earwig is a 2021 international co-production drama film based on the eponymous novel by Brian Catling.

Cast
 Alex Lawther - Laurence
 Paul Hilton - Albert
 Romaine Hemelaers - Mia

References

External links 

2021 drama films